Christian Petrovcic (born 26 February 1991) is an Austrian footballer currently playing for DSV Leoben.

Career

Club career
Petrovcic started his career in his hometown at DSV Leoben. In 2005 he moved to Grazer AK, for which he made his debut in the Austrian Regionalliga in April 2009. In 2010 he returned to DSV Leoben on loan and stayed at the club after the season. In 2013 he was relegated from the Regionalliga with Leoben, where he also started working as a youth goalkeeper coach since the 2012-13 season.

In 2014 he moved to Austrian Football Second League club Kapfenberger SV, where he made his professional debut against SC Wiener Neustadt in March 2016. After leaving the club at in the summer 2018, he began working as a youth goalkeeper coach at Kapfenberger - also for the first team - and also at DFC Leoben.

For the 2018/19 season he returned to DSV Leoben.

References

External links

 

1991 births
Living people
Austrian footballers
Grazer AK players
DSV Leoben players
Kapfenberger SV players
2. Liga (Austria) players
Association football goalkeepers